Mars Needs Guitars! is Australian rock group Hoodoo Gurus' second album, released in August 1985. The title is a reference to the 1967 science fiction film, Mars Needs Women. Singles from the album were "Bittersweet", "Like Wow – Wipeout", "Death Defying" and "Poison Pen". Mars Needs Guitars! reached No. 140 on the American Billboard 200 albums chart in 1986.

The title track, "Mars Needs Guitars" (also the B-side of "Bittersweet" single), was written by all five Gurus and lead vocals were by Brad Shepherd. All other tracks were written and featured lead vocals by Dave Faulkner. Hayride to Hell (1995) is a short film written and directed by former Gurus member Kimble Rendall.

In 2000, Dave Faulkner said "When we commenced the sessions for Mars Needs Guitars! we had a brand new drummer, Mark Kingsmill who altered our lives forever with his distinctive explosive style."

In October 2010, it was listed in the book, 100 Best Australian Albums, with their previous album, Stoneage Romeos at No. 28.

Reception
Cash Box magazine said "Excellent dynamics and songwriting shine through on nearly every cut."

Track listing

Personnel
Credited to:

Hoodoo Gurus
 Clyde Bramley – bass, backing vocals
 Dave Faulkner – lead vocals (except track 9), guitar, keyboards
 Mark Kingsmill – drums, cymbals
 Brad Shepherd – lead guitar, backing vocals, lead vocals (track 9), harmonica (mouth harp)

Technical
 John Bee – engineer
 Richard Allan – illustrations
 Charles Fisher – producer (except track 11)
 Don Bartley – mastering (remastering)
 Hoodoo Gurus – producer (track 11)

Charts

Certifications

References

Hoodoo Gurus albums
1985 albums